Garstang is a surname. Notable people with the surname include:

Jim Garstang, pianist for the Cathedral Quartet from 1972 through 1973
John Garstang 1876–1956, British archaeologist of the ancient Near East
John Garstang (footballer) (1876–1957),  English footballer
Marie Garstang 1880-1949, archaeologist, wife of John Garstang
Timi Garstang, American-born Marshallese track athlete
Walter Garstang 1868–1949, Professor of Zoology at the University of Leeds, one of the first to study the functional biology of marine invertebrate larvae